Tillie the Toiler is a 1941 American comedy film directed by Sidney Salkow and starring Kay Harris, William Tracy, and George Watts. The screenplay was written by Karen DeWolf and Francis Martin, from DeWolf's story, which in turn was based on the comic strip of the same name by Russ Westover. It was the second film based on the comic strip, and the first sound picture, the other being the 1927 silent film also titled Tillie the Toiler.

Cast list

 Kay Harris as Tillie Jones
 William Tracy as Clarence "Mac" MacDougall
 George Watts as Simpkins
 Daphne Pollard as Mumsy
 Jack Arnold as Wally Whipple
 Marjorie Reynolds as Bubbles
 Bennie Bartlett as Glennie
 Stanley Brown as Ted Williams
 Ernest Truex as George Winker
 Franklin Pangborn as Perry Tweedale
 Sylvia Field as Teacher
 Edward Gargan as Policeman
 Ralph Dunn as Policeman
 Harry Tyler as Pop
 Harry C. Bradley as Man in derby
 Netta Packer as Miss Wilson
 Ben Hall as Messenger boy
 Bruce Bennett as Tom
 Harry Anderson as Workman
 Eddie Laughton as Delivery man
 Arthur Stuart Hull as Little man
 Mary Ainslee as Stella
 Claire DuBrey as Stella's mother
 Louise Currie as Mrs. Williams
 Joe McGuinn as Stage manager
 Larry Williams as Jim
 Charles Gordon as Young man
 Richard Crane as Young man
 Richard Keene as Ronald
 Robert Kent as George

References

External links
 
 
 

Columbia Pictures films
Films directed by Sidney Salkow
American comedy films
1941 comedy films
1941 films
Films based on American comics
Films based on comic strips
Live-action films based on comics
American black-and-white films
1940s American films